The Archdiocese of Porto Alegre is a Latin Rite Metropolitan Archbishopric of the Roman Catholic Church in Rio Grande do Sul state, southernmost Brazil.

The Archdiocese's mother church and Metropolitan seat of its Archbishop is the Metropolitan Cathedral of Our Lady Mother of God in Porto Alegre. Archbishop Emeritus Dadeus Grings was succeeded by the current incumbent, Archbishop Jaime Spengler, who was appointed on 18 September 2013 by Pope Francis, and installed on 15 November 2013.

History 
 It was erected as the Diocese of São Pedro do Rio Grande by Pope Pius IX on 7 May 1848, on territory split off from the Diocese of São Sebastião do Rio de Janeiro.
 It was elevated by Pope Pius X on 15 August 1910 to the rank of a Metropolitan archdiocese/ Portalegren(sis) in Brasilia (Latin), having lost territories to establish Diocese of Pelotas, Diocese of Santa Maria and Diocese of Uruguaiana.
 Lost territories on 1934.09.08 to establish the Diocese of Caxias and Territorial Prelature of Vacaria
 1957.01.18: Gained territory back from above Territorial Prelature of Vacaria
 Lost territories repeatedly : on 1959.06.20 to establish Diocese of Santa Cruz do Sul, on 1959.08.15 to above Diocese of Caxias, on 1971.02.01 to above Diocese of Caxias do Sul, on 1980.02.02 to establish the Diocese of Novo Hamburgo, as its suffragan, on 1999.11.10 to establish the Diocese of Osorio, as its suffragan, and on 2008.07.02: to establish the Diocese of Montenegro, as its suffragan
 It enjoyed a Papal visit from Pope John Paul II in July 1980.

Statistics 
As per 2014, it pastorally served 2,547,000 Catholics (74.4% of 3,423,000 total) on 13,530 km² in 156 parishes and 739 missions with 359 priests (203 diocesan, 156 religious), 59 deacons, 1,450 lay religious (341 brothers, 1,109 sisters) and 44 seminarians.

Ecclesiastical province 
Besides administering his own Archbishopric, the Metropolitan supervises the following Suffragan Sees :
 Roman Catholic Diocese of Caxias do Sul
 Roman Catholic Diocese of Montenegro, its daughter
 Roman Catholic Diocese of Novo Hamburgo, its daughter
 Roman Catholic Diocese of Osório, its daughter

Bishops

Episcopal ordinaries, and current auxiliary bishops

Suffragan Bishops of São Pedro do Rio Grande 
 Feliciano Rodrigues de Araujo Prates (1851.05.05 – death 1858.05.27)
 Sebastião Dias Laranjeira (1860.09.28 – death 1888.08.13)
 Cláudio Gonçalves Ponce de Leon, Lazarists (C.M.) (1890.06.26 – 1910.08.15 see below), previously Bishop of Goiás (Brazil) (1881.05.13 – 1890.06.26)
 Coadjutor Bishop: João Antônio Pimenta (1906.02.21 – 1911.03.07), Titular Bishop of Pentacomia (1906.02.21 – 1911.03.07); next Bishop of Montes Claros (Brazil) (1911.03.07 – 1943.07.20)

Metropolitan Archbishops of Porto Alegre
 Cláudio Gonçalves Ponce de Leon, Lazarists (C.M.) (see above 1910.08.15 – retired 1912.01.09), emeritate as Titular Archbishop of Anazarbus (1912.01.09 – death 1924.05.26)
 João (Batista) Becker (1912.01.09 – 1946.12.30), previously Bishop of Santa Catarina (Brazil) (1908.05.03 – 1912.08.01) 
 Alfredo Scherer (1946.12.30 – 1981.08.29), Cardinal in 1969; previously Titular Bishop of Hemeria (1946.06.13 – 1946.12.30) as Auxiliary Bishop of Porto Alegre (1946.06.13 – 1946.12.30)
 João Colling (1981.08.29 – retired 1991.07.17), died 1992; previously Titular Bishop of Corone (1949.12.12 – 1951.03.23) as Auxiliary Bishop of Santa Maria (Brazil) (1949.12.12 – 1951.03.23), Bishop of Passo Fundo (Brazil) (1951.03.23 – 1981.08.29)
 Altamiro Rossato, Congregation of the Most Holy Redeemer (Redemptorists, C.Ss.R.) (1991.07.17 – retired 2001.02.07)); died 13 May 2014; previously Bishop of Marabá (Brazil) (1985.12.08 – 1989.03.15), Coadjutor Archbishop of Porto Alegre (1989.03.15 – succession 1991.07.17)
 Dadeus Grings (2001.02.07 – retired 2013.09.18); previously Bishop of São João da Boa Vista (Brazil) (1991.01.23 – 2000.04.12), Coadjutor Archbishop of Porto Alegre (2000.04.12 – succession 2001.02.07)
 Jaime Spengler (18 September 2013– ...), previously Titular Bishop of Patara (2010.11.10 – 2013.09.18) as Auxiliary Bishop of Porto Alegre (2010.11.10 – 2013.09.18)
 Auxiliary Bishop (2015.01.07 – ...) Leomar Antônio Brustolin, Titular Bishop of Tigava
 Auxiliary Bishop (2015.12.30 – ...) Aparecido Donizete de Souza, Titular Bishop of Macriana minor
 Auxiliary Bishop (2016.01.27 – ...) Adilson Pedro Busin, C.S., Titular Bishop of Guardialfiera
 Auxiliary Bishop (2019.04.10 - ...) Darley José Kummer, Titular Bishop of Elvas

Coadjutor bishops
João Antônio Pimenta (1906-1911), did not succeed to see; appointed Bishop of Montes Claros
Altamiro Rossato, C.SS.R. (1991-2001)
Dadeus Grings (2000-2001)

Previous auxiliary episcopate, in reverse chronological order 
BIOS TO ELABORATE & WORK IN
 Auxiliary Bishop: Agenor Girardi, M.S.C. (2010.12.22 – 2015.05.06), appointed Bishop of União da Vitória, Parana
 Auxiliary Bishop: Remídio José Bohn (2006.01.18 – 2011.12.28), appointed Bishop of Cachoeira do Sul, Rio Grande do Sul
 Auxiliary Bishop::Jaime Spengler, O.F.M. (2010.11.10 - 2018.09.18), appointed Archbishop here
 Auxiliary Bishop: Alessandro Carmelo Ruffinoni, C.S. (2006.01.18 – 2010.06.16), appointed Coadjutor Bishop of Caxias do Sul, Rio Grande do Sul
 Auxiliary Bishop: Jacinto Inácio Flach (2003.11.12 – 2009.09.16), appointed Bishop of Criciúma, Santa Catarina
 Auxiliary Bishop: Eduardo Benes de Sales Rodrigues (1998.03.11 – 2001.01.10), appointed Bishop of Lorena, Sao Paulo; future Archbishop
 Auxiliary Bishop: José Clemente Weber (1994.03.23 – 2004.06.15), appointed Bishop of Santo Ângelo, Rio Grande do Sul
 Auxiliary Bishop: Osvino José Both (1990.06.26 – 1995.11.22), appointed Bishop of Novo Hamburgo, Rio Grande do Sul; future Archbishop
 Auxiliary Bishop: Thadeu Gomes Canellas (1983.11.19 – 1999.11.10), appointed	Bishop of Osório, Rio Grande do Sul
 Auxiliary Bishop: José Mário Stroeher (1983.03.25 – 1986.08.08), appointed Bishop of Rio Grande, Rio Grande do Sul
 Auxiliary Bishop: Urbano José Allgayer (1974.02.05 – 1982.02.04), appointed Bishop of Passo Fundo, Rio Grande do Sul
 Auxiliary Bishop: Antônio do Carmo Cheuiche, O.C.D. (1971.05.05 – 2001.06.27)
 Auxiliary Bishop: José Ivo Lorscheiter (1965.11.12 – 1974.02.05), appointed Bishop of Santa Maria, Rio Grande do Sul
 Auxiliary Bishop: Edmundo Luís Kunz (1955.08.01 – 1988.09.12)
 Auxiliary Bishop: Alfredo Vicente Scherer (1946.06.13 - 1946.12.30), appointed Archbishop here

Other priests of this diocese who became bishops
Luiz Felipe de Nadal, appointed Bishop of Uruguaiana, Rio Grande do Sul in 1955
Zeno Hastenteufel, appointed Bishop of Frederico Westphalen, Rio Grande do Sul in 2001
Jacinto Bergmann, appointed Auxiliary Bishop of Pelotas, Rio Grande do Sul in 2002
Liro Vendelino Meurer, appointed Auxiliary Bishop of Passo Fundo in 2009
Rodolfo Luís Weber, appointed Prelate of Cristalândia in 2009
Silvio Guterres Dutra, appointed Bishop of Vacaria, Rio Grande do Sul in 2018

See also 
 List of Catholic dioceses in Brazil
 Roman Catholicism in Brazil

References

Sources and external links 
 GCatholic.org, with Google map & - satellite photo - data for all sections~
 
 

Porto Alegre
 
Religious organizations established in 1848
1848 establishments in Brazil
Archdiocese of Porto Alegre
Porto Alegre, Archiodese
Porto Alegre, Archiodese